Aurelio Genghini (1 October 1907 – 11 September 2001) was an Italian long-distance runner. He competed in the marathon at the 1936 Summer Olympics.

References

External links
 

1907 births
2001 deaths
Athletes (track and field) at the 1936 Summer Olympics
Italian male long-distance runners
Italian male marathon runners
Olympic athletes of Italy